The Scorpio Letters is a 1967 American-British thriller film directed by Richard Thorpe and starring Alex Cord, Shirley Eaton and Laurence Naismith. It was produced by MGM Television and shot mainly at MGM studios in Hollywood. It was broadcast by ABC in the United States while being given a theatrical release in several countries including Britain. It was the last film directed by Thorpe in a lengthy and prolific career. It is based on the 1964 novel of the same title by Victor Canning.

There are significant differences between the book and the film version, which was designed to take advantage of the spy boom following the success of James Bond. Eaton's link to that series was advertised by billing her as "The Goldfinger Girl". The film's sets were designed by the art directors Addison Hehr and George W. Davis. As it was intended for a cinematic run in several markets, particularly in Europe, it was made with higher production values than was often common for television films. It received positive reviews with Variety describing it as "very hip".

Synopsis
Joe Christopher an American in London working for British Intelligence joins forces with Phoebe Stewart to investigate the death of a fellow agent who was the victim of a blackmail plot. Their pursuit of the truth takes them to Paris and an Alpine ski resort.

Cast
 Alex Cord as 	Joe Christopher
 Shirley Eaton as Phoebe Stewart
 Laurence Naismith as 	Burr
 Oscar Beregi Jr. as Philippe Soriel (Scorpio)
 Lester Matthews as Mr. Harris
 Antoinette Bower as Terry
 Arthur Malet as Hinton
 Barry Ford as 	Bratter
 Émile Genest as Garin
 Vincent Beck as 	Paul Fretoni
 Ilka Windish as Miss Gunther
 Laurie Main as Tyson
 Andre Philippe as Gian
 Harry Raybould as Lodel
 Danielle De Metz as Marie
 Milton Parsons as Mr. Atkinson
 Ivor Barry as Rt. Hon. John Murney

References

Bibliography
 Goble, Alan. The Complete Index to Literary Sources in Film. Walter de Gruyter, 1999.
 Murphy, Robert. Directors in British and Irish Cinema: A Reference Companion. British Film Institute, 2006.

External links

1967 films
American thriller films
British thriller films
1960s thriller films
1960s English-language films
Films set in London
Films shot in England
Films set in Paris
Films directed by Richard Thorpe
Films based on British novels
Metro-Goldwyn-Mayer films
1960s American films
1960s British films